Antoine de Saint-Yon was a French physician and chemist of the late 17th and early 18th centuries.

Biography
Antoine de Saint-Yon passed his medical thesis in 1671 with the title: 

He was a substitute professor for Guy-Crescent Fagon at the chair of chemistry in the Jardin du Roi in 1695, 1707 and 1715. Among his students were Sébastien Vaillant and Gilles-François Boulduc.

Antoine de Saint-Yon died without having left any writing on medicine or chemistry.

Notes

References

17th-century French physicians
18th-century French physicians
17th-century French chemists
18th-century French chemists